Stephen Gough (born 21 March 1981 in Dublin, Ireland) is an Irish footballer who plays for Crumlin United F.C. in the Leinster Senior League.

He began his career at Bray Wanderers F.C. and then signed for a short spell at Monaghan United at the start of the shortened 2002/03 season. He signed for Shamrock Rovers shortly after and made his Rovers debut on 11 October 2002.

He made four appearances in the UEFA Intertoto Cup, before transferring to Longford in July 2005.

In December 2006, he signed back for Bray Wanderers F.C., but was released at the end of the 2007 season.

Honours
SRFC Young Player of the Year:
 Shamrock Rovers – 2002/03

References

Living people
1981 births
Republic of Ireland association footballers
Association football defenders
Shamrock Rovers F.C. players
Drogheda United F.C. players
Bray Wanderers F.C. players
Longford Town F.C. players
Monaghan United F.C. players
League of Ireland players
Crumlin United F.C. players
Leinster Senior League (association football) players